Fausto Mazzoleni (born December 15, 1960) is a former Swiss professional ice hockey defenceman. He played in the Nationalliga A for HC Davos, EHC Kloten and EV Zug.

Mazzoleni participated as a member of the Swiss national team at the 1988 Winter Olympics.

References

External links

1960 births
Living people
ECH Chur players
EV Zug players
HC Davos players
Ice hockey players at the 1988 Winter Olympics
EHC Kloten players
Olympic ice hockey players of Switzerland
Swiss ice hockey defencemen
People from Chur
Sportspeople from Graubünden